Renealmia aurantifera is a species of plant in the family Zingiberaceae. It is endemic to Ecuador.  Its natural habitat is subtropical or tropical moist montane forests.

References

Endemic flora of Ecuador
aurantifera
Least concern plants
Taxonomy articles created by Polbot